David Bowditch Morse (born October 11, 1953) is an American actor, singer, television director, and writer. He first came to national attention as Dr. Jack "Boomer" Morrison in the medical drama series St. Elsewhere (1982–88). His film career has included roles in The Negotiator, Contact, The Green Mile, Dancer in the Dark, Disturbia, The Long Kiss Goodnight, The Rock and 12 Monkeys.

In 2006, Morse had a recurring role as Detective Michael Tritter on the medical drama series House, for which he received an Emmy Award nomination. He portrayed George Washington in the 2008 HBO miniseries John Adams, which garnered him a second Emmy nomination. He received acclaim for his portrayal of Uncle Peck on the Off-Broadway play How I Learned to Drive, earning a Drama Desk Award and Obie Award. He has had success on Broadway, portraying James "Sharky" Harkin in The Seafarer. From 2010 to 2013, he portrayed Terry Colson, an honest police officer in a corrupt New Orleans police department, on the HBO series Treme. Morse appeared in the WGN America series Outsiders (2016–17), in the Showtime miniseries Escape at Dannemora (2018) and the Netflix comedy drama series The Chair (2021).

Early life
Morse was born October 11, 1953, in Beverly, Massachusetts, the son of Jacquelyn Morse, a school teacher, and Charles Morse, a sales manager. He was raised in Essex, Massachusetts and Hamilton, Massachusetts. His middle name, Bowditch, comes from mathematician Nathaniel Bowditch.

Career

Film and television
After graduating from high school in 1971, Morse studied acting at the William Esper Studio. He began his acting career in the theater as a player for the Boston Repertory Theatre in the early 1970s. In the mid-1970s, Esquire Jauchem, artistic director of the Boston Repertory Theater, adapted and directed a stage musical version of The Point! that starred an 18-year-old Morse as Oblio. The production later toured to the Trinity Square Repertory Company in Providence. He spent some time in New York's theater community in the early 1980s before moving into television and film. 

During that time, Morse was listed as one of the twelve most "Promising New Actors of 1980" in John A. Willis's Screen World, Vol. 32. Morse's big break came in 1982 when he was cast in the television medical drama St. Elsewhere. He played Dr. Jack "Boomer" Morrison, a young physician who is forced to deal with the death of his wife and the struggles of a single parent professional.

Morse appeared in a number of supporting roles following St. Elsewhere. He is quoted as saying: "I made the decision that I didn't care if there was any money in the role or not. I had to find roles that were different from what I had been doing." His turn in Desperate Hours as antagonist showed a darker Morse. He later starred in The Indian Runner and The Crossing Guard. He has appeared in three adaptations of Stephen King stories: The Langoliers, Hearts in Atlantis, and The Green Mile. He was a guest star on Homicide: Life on the Street, playing a racist cousin of Detective Tim Bayliss.

In 2002, Morse starred as Mike Olshansky, an ex-Philadelphia police officer turned cab driver, in the television film Hack. For his role in the 2002 crime-drama film Shuang Tong, Morse was nominated as Best Supporting Actor in the Golden Horse Awards, the first ever nomination for an English-speaking actor. He appeared as questionable neighbor Mr. Turner in the 2007 release Disturbia. Film critic and commentator John Podhoretz wrote that Morse is a "largely unsung character actor who enlivens and deepens every movie fortunate enough to have him in the cast".

In 2006, Morse received a phone call from David Shore, having previously worked with him on the Hack series, who asked him if he would be interested in having a guest role on House. When Morse watched the show, he could not understand why people watched the show, because he believed that "this House guy is a total jerk". When he told some of his friends about the offer, however, their excited reactions convinced him to accept the role. Morse portrayed Michael Tritter, a detective with a vendetta against Dr. House. He earned his first Emmy Award nomination for his work on the series.

In 2008, Morse portrayed George Washington in the HBO miniseries John Adams, for which his nose was made bigger. Morse commented: "The first thing that comes to mind is my nose; it was my big idea to do that nose. We didn't have a lot of time, because they asked me to do this about three weeks before they started shooting, and I just kept looking at these portraits and thinking 'this man's face is so commanding'. And I did not feel that my face was very commanding in the way his was. So I convinced them that we should try the nose, and we tried it on, and everybody went 'wow, that's Washington'." Morse's portrayal earned him his second Emmy Award nomination. He is currently reprising the role of Washington in voice form as part of The Hall of Presidents show in Walt Disney World Resort's Magic Kingdom.

Morse has stated that out of all of the films he has done, his favorites are The Green Mile, The Crossing Guard, and The Indian Runner. 

In 2010, he guest starred in two episodes of the HBO drama series Treme, as Lt. Terry Colson of the New Orleans Police Department. He was promoted to series regular starting with the show's second season, which began in April 2011. Later that year, Morse won the best actor award at the Karlovy Vary International Film Festival for his role in Collaborator. He played an ex-CIA agent in the film World War Z (2013). He played the late NFL player, Mike Webster, in the biographical sports drama Concussion.

Stage
In addition to his film and television career, Morse has continued to appear on stage. For his performance in the 1997 Off-Broadway production of Paula Vogel's Pulitzer Prize-winning drama How I Learned to Drive, he received an Obie Award, a Drama League Award, a Drama Desk Award, and a Lucille Lortel Award. That same year, he played Father Barry in the play adaptation of On the Waterfront.  From 2007 to 2008, Morse appeared on Broadway in Conor McPherson's play The Seafarer. He received a Tony Award nomination for his role in the 2018 Broadway revival of The Iceman Cometh.

Personal life
Morse has three younger siblings. He has been married to actress and author of The Habit, Susan Wheeler Duff Morse, since 1982. They have one daughter, Eliza, and twin sons Benjamin and Samuel. After the 1994 Northridge earthquake, Morse and his family moved to Philadelphia, Pennsylvania, where they currently live.

Filmography

Film

Television

Selected stage work

Audiobook performances

References

External links

 
 
 
 David Morse at the Internet Off-Broadway Database

1953 births
20th-century American male actors
21st-century American male actors
Living people
American male film actors
American male singers
American male stage actors
American male television actors
American television directors
Drama Desk Award winners
Male actors from Massachusetts
Male actors from Philadelphia
Obie Award recipients
People from Beverly, Massachusetts
People from Hamilton, Massachusetts
Singers from Massachusetts
William Esper Studio alumni